John Danielsen (born 13 July 1939) is a Danish former footballer who played as a midfielder. During his club career he played for Boldklubben 1909. He earned 27 caps for the Denmark national team, won a silver medal in football at the 1960 Summer Olympics, and was in the finals squad for the 1964 European Nations' Cup. He played for 1909 from Odense in Denmark. He was transferred to the German club Werder Bremen, later returning to play for B 1909 again at the end of his career in the early 1970s.

References

External links

 

1939 births
Living people
Footballers from Odense
Danish men's footballers
Association football midfielders
Denmark international footballers
Denmark under-21 international footballers
Denmark youth international footballers
Olympic footballers of Denmark
Medalists at the 1960 Summer Olympics
Footballers at the 1960 Summer Olympics
Olympic silver medalists for Denmark
1964 European Nations' Cup players
Olympic medalists in football
Bundesliga players
SV Werder Bremen players
FC Chiasso players
Danish expatriate men's footballers
Danish expatriate sportspeople in Germany
Expatriate footballers in Germany
Danish expatriate sportspeople in Switzerland
Expatriate footballers in Switzerland